Bakerella is genus of sixteen showy mistletoe species in Madagascar and the Mascarenes. The genus was described by the Belgian botanist Simone Balle in Flora de Madagascar, 1964. In some parts of Madagascar they are an important food source for lemurs.

References

Loranthaceae
Loranthaceae genera